Washington Cemetery may refer to:

Washington Cemetery (Brooklyn)
Washington Cemetery (Washington Court House, Ohio)